Lycaenopsis is a genus of lycaenid butterflies.

References

 
Lycaenidae genera